The following is a list of matches played by the Mauritius national football team from 1947 to 1968.
Since Mauritius became an independent nation in 1968, these results were all played while Mauritius was still owned by the United Kingdom. Mauritius won their first 17 games in a row, only playing in the Indian Ocean Games Triangulaire. They won 10 of 13 triangulaire tournaments, playing only Réunion and Madagascar until 1967.

Triangulaire
Mauritius won the Triangulaire eight years in a row from 1947 to 1954, then again in 1956 and 1957. They won 10 times and were the most successful team. They came in second in 1955 and 1958, and came in third in 1963. The triangulaire was where Mauritius had their first game, their first win, and their biggest win. Mauritius won their first 17 games in a row, achieving an ELO ranking of 22

Final positions

Record vs. other teams

Key

1940s

1947

This was Mauritius's first result and their first win.

1948

1949

1950s

1950

This is Mauritius's biggest win to date.

1951

1952

1953

1954

1955

This was Mauritius's first loss, breaking a 17-game winning streak.

1956

This was Mauritius's first draw.

1957

1958

1960s

1963

*Abandoned at 1-1 at 54'

1967

1968

References

1940s in Mauritius
1950s in Mauritius
1960s in Mauritius
Mauritius national football team results